Great Britain and Ireland have a very varied toponymy due to the different settlement patterns, political and linguistic histories. In addition to the old and modern varieties of English, Scottish and Irish Gaelic and Welsh, many other languages and cultures have influenced geographical names including Anglo-Normans, Anglo Saxons, Romans and Vikings. Ultimately, most of the toponyms derive from the Celtic, North and West Germanic and Italic (including Romance) branches of the Indo-European language family, although there is evidence of some Pre-Indo-European languages.

The different toponymy in different parts of the United Kingdom and Ireland are discussed in the following articles:

 English toponymy
 Irish toponymy covers the whole of Ireland as the two political entities have only been separate since 1921.
 Scottish toponymy
 Welsh toponymy

British toponymy
Irish toponymy
British Isles